Mamadou Kanteh Danjo (born 27 August 1989), commonly known as Kuku, is a Spanish footballer who plays for UE Sant Andreu as a striker.

Club career
Born in Calella, Barcelona, Catalonia, to Gambian parents, Kuku finished his formation with CD Blanes. After making his senior debut with the first team in the Tercera División, he went on to resume his career in the regional leagues, representing CE Olímpic Malgrat, UE Tossa, CF Lloret and UE Poble Nou 2000.

In 2014, Kuku joined CE Júpiter in Primera Catalana, being the club's top goalscorer during his two-year spell and achieving promotion to the fourth division. In June 2016, he moved abroad for the first time in his career, after agreeing to a contract with I liga side Wigry Suwałki.

Kuku made his professional debut on 5 August 2016, coming on as a second-half substitute for Łukasz Wroński in a 2–1 home win against Znicz Pruszków. He struggled with injuries during his spell abroad, contributing with only eight league appearances, all from the bench.

On 17 July 2017, Kuku returned to Spain and its fourth division, after joining UE Sant Andreu. On 1 July 2019, he moved to UE Llagostera of the Segunda División B.

Personal life
Kuku's younger brother Tamba is also a footballer. A winger, both played together as a senior at Poble Nou.

References

External links

1989 births
Living people
People from Calella
Sportspeople from the Province of Barcelona
Spanish people of Gambian descent
Spanish sportspeople of African descent
Spanish footballers
Footballers from Catalonia
Association football forwards
Segunda División B players
Tercera División players
Divisiones Regionales de Fútbol players
UE Sant Andreu footballers
UE Costa Brava players
I liga players
Wigry Suwałki players
Spanish expatriate footballers
Spanish expatriate sportspeople in Poland
Expatriate footballers in Poland